George Henry Finch  (20 February 1835 – 22 May 1907) was an English Conservative politician who represented Rutland in the House of Commons for nearly 40 years, becoming Father of the House of Commons in 1906.

Finch was the son of George Finch, of Burley-on-the-Hill near Oakham and Belton. On the death of his father in 1870 he became an extensive landowner, inheriting Burley House, near Oakham, Rutland.

Finch was elected as the Member of Parliament for Rutland on 23 November 1867. He held the seat until his death in 1907.

He married twice; firstly, in 1861, Emily Eglantyne Balfour, who died in 1865 after giving him a son and 2 daughters and secondly, Edith Montgomery, with whom he had a further 7 children. Burley House passed to his son Alan George Finch.

References

External links 
 

|-

1835 births
1907 deaths
Members of the Parliament of the United Kingdom for English constituencies
UK MPs 1865–1868
UK MPs 1868–1874
UK MPs 1874–1880
UK MPs 1880–1885
UK MPs 1885–1886
UK MPs 1886–1892
UK MPs 1892–1895
UK MPs 1895–1900
UK MPs 1900–1906
George
Members of the Privy Council of the United Kingdom
People from Burley, Rutland